Bidhuna is a constituency of the Uttar Pradesh Legislative Assembly covering the city of Bidhuna in the Auraiya district of Uttar Pradesh, India.

Bidhuna is one of five assembly constituencies in the Kannauj Lok Sabha constituency. Since 2008, this assembly constituency is numbered 202 amongst 403 constituencies.

Election results

2022 
Samajwadi Party candidate  Rekha Verma  won in 2022 Uttar Pradesh Legislative Elections defeating Bhartiya Janta Party candidate Riya Shakya by a margin of 	7,765 votes.

References

External links
 

Assembly constituencies of Uttar Pradesh
Auraiya district